Turgen may refer to:
Türgen, a mountain in Mongolia
Türgen, Uvs, a district in western Mongolia
Turgen, Kazakhstan, a village in the Almaty Province, Kazakhstan
Turgen, Russia, a rural locality (a selo) in Zabaykalsky Krai, Russia
Turgen Alimatov (1922 – 2008), Uzbek classic music and shashmaqam player and composer